"De Una Vez" is a song recorded by American singer Selena Gomez. It was released on January 14, 2021, by Interscope Records, as the first single from her first Spanish-language extended play, Revelación (2021). Tapping into her Mexican heritage, "De Una Vez" marks Gomez's first Spanish-language single, with production from Tainy, Albert Hype, and Jota Rosa. It is a rhythmic pop and alternative R&B song with urban elements, discussing themes of love, self-worth, emotional growth, and empowerment.

Gomez described the song as a "beautiful love anthem". The official music video for "De Una Vez" was released to YouTube alongside the song. Heavily inspired by her Latin American culture, the mystical video adapts the art style of magic realism and depicts Gomez with a glowing milagro resembling the Sacred Heart, chronicling her personal evolution and healing. The video was met with critical acclaim and was nominated for the Latin Grammy Award for Best Short Form Music Video at the 22nd ceremony, marking Gomez's first nomination. "De Una Vez" reached top-ten in Costa Rica, Panama, Paraguay, Venezuela, US Hot Latin Songs, and the top-forty on the Billboard Global 200.

Release and composition

In December 2020, Gomez stated that she has "a whole little vessel of good things coming", and Billboard pointed out that this "could include a Spanish-language project". Various murals were spotted in Mexico, stating the song titles "De Una Vez" and "Baila Conmigo", generating speculating amidst fans and mainstream media that Gomez would be releasing Latin music soon.

On January 14, 2021, Gomez announced the release of "De Una Vez" slated for midnight. Later that day, she "quoted" a tweet dating from January 2011 that referenced a Spanish-language album that was never released, stating: "I think it will be worth the wait", which is exactly a decade since the tweet. "De Una Vez" acts as Gomez's first official Spanish-language single in over 10 years, and second overall after the Spanish version of "A Year Without Rain" (2010), titled "Un Año Sin Lluvia", by her former band Selena Gomez & the Scene. It is her first Spanish effort since "Taki Taki" (2018) with DJ Snake, Ozuna and Cardi B, and first solo foray since the track "Más" from her 2014 compilation album, For You. The song is two minutes and 36 seconds in length, and is the lead single from her first Spanish-language EP Revelación.

"De Una Vez" is a rhythmic pop and alternative R&B song inspired by Empress Of. It also has mimimal urban elements. It discusses Gomez's personal healing, love, empowerment, forgiveness, and having the strength to move forward, away from the past. It was produced by Tainy, Albert Hype, and Jota Rosa.

Music video
The official music video for "De Una Vez", was recorded and shot in September 2020 and directed by Los Pérez, produced by Caviar LA and post produced by Eighty4, premiered on January 14, 2021, alongside the release of the song. It received critical acclaim for its visuals and symbolisms, and was nominated for Best Short Form Music Video at the 22nd Annual Latin Grammy Awards, and winning Favorite Music Video at the 2021 Latin American Music Awards.

Synopsis

In the video, Gomez traverses through many rooms in a mystical house, depicting her creative and personal growth using metaphors that reflect on her evolution. She moves from a bedroom decorated with fertile plants and dreams, to a room luminated with lamps, then a kitchen, and a room with levitating vinyl discs and music instruments. Throughout the video, Gomez wears a glowing crystal heart on her chest (an object similar to Sacred Heart), representing her resilience, while she sings the song's lyrics that center on love and healing. The video ends with the words "Baila Conmigo..." ( "Dance with Me..."), which has been noted to be a clue to a follow-up song or album.

Direction and production
As "De Una Vez" steers Gomez into a new phase in her music career, she wanted the song's visuals to have an impact on viewers, handled by directors that can deeply connect to the material. She stated: "If I was going to completely immerse myself into a project inspired by Latin culture, I wanted to work with native Spanish-speaking creators". Due to the COVID-19 pandemic and accompanying travel restrictions, the video was shot remotely. The directors were unable to fly to Los Angeles to shoot the video, and were linked to the shooting spot via laptop instead. The entire video was filmed at night, in a single shot with hidden cuts.

Gomez collaborated with Los Pérez, a duo consisting of Mexican director Tania Verduzco and Spanish director Adrián Pérez—a married couple who have worked on commercial advertisements such as for Pepsi and Candy Crush Saga. Wanting to create an emotional journey with the video, Verduzco explained that they "thought that the song had a sincere and personal message, more of the woman than the artist. We had to bring that to light [because] it's a song about a mature woman healing a wound, leaving the past behind, and entering into a new chapter". To channel this idea, Gomez and Los Pérez looked at popular Latin American writers Isabel Allende, Gabriel García Márquez, and Laura Esquivel, whose literary works delved into supernatural concepts of magical realism, an art genre that blends real-world problems with elements of fantasy. Gomez also infused Mexican cultural references into the video, such as the Sacred Heart, a symbol tightly related to Mexican folk art. The team designed the heart based on a Milagro, a Christian folk charm, to symbolize the video's themes of healing.

Gomez's fashion choice for the video follows a "botanical motif", which represents emotional growth. Styled by Shirley Kurata, Gomez wears a soft-pink floral Rodarte dress, with a V-neck, puffed sleeves, and pink, white and yellow daisy prints. The crystal heart is pinned to the centre of the dress. Her wavy hair is adorned with Frida Kahlo-inspired flower accessories made from silk, paired with feathered opal earrings from Mexican designer Daniela Villegas. Gomez's makeup was kept soft, romantic and feminine, using her own Rare Beauty line, in collaboration with longtime makeup artist Melissa Murdick. Murdick was inspired by the runway images from Dolce & Gabbana spring 2014 and Alexander McQueen's spring 2016 fashion shows for Gomez's look.

Accolades

Credits and personnel
Credits adapted from YouTube.

Musicians

 Selena Gomez – vocals, songwriting
 Tainy – songwriting, production, programming
 Jota Rosa – production, programming
 Albert Hype – production, programming
 Neon16 – production
 Abner Cordero Boria – songwriting
 Christopher Carballo Ramos – songwriting
 Andrea Mangiamarchi – songwriting
 Alejandro Borrero – songwriting
 Ivanni Rodríguez – songwriting
 Ricardo López Lalinde – songwriting

Technical

 Serban Ghenea – mixing, studio personnel
 John Hanes – mix engineering, studio personnel
 John Janick – A&R, studio personnel, production coordinating
 Sam Riback – A&R, studio personnel, production coordinating
 Vanessa Angiuli – A&R, studio personnel, production coordinating
 Lex Borrero – A&R, studio personnel, production coordinating
 Ivanni Rodríguez – A&R, studio personnel, production coordinating
 Aleen Keshishian – studio personnel, production coordinating
 Zack Morgenroth – studio personnel, production coordinating
 Bart Schoudel - vocal production, engineering, studio personnel
 Chris Gehringer – master engineering, studio personnel
 Angelo Carretta – engineering, studio personnel

Charts

Release history

References

External links
 
 

2021 singles
2021 songs
2020s ballads
Interscope Records singles
Selena Gomez songs
Spanish-language songs
Songs written by Selena Gomez
Songs written by Tainy
Songs written by Elena Rose
Impact of the COVID-19 pandemic on the music industry